Talluba Parish(Baradine County) is a civil parish of Baradine County, New South Wales.

The  parish is on the Namoi River and the only town of the civil Parish is Pilliga, New South Wales.

References

Localities in New South Wales
Geography of New South Wales